An electric train is a train powered by electricity, and may refer to:
 Electric locomotive 
 Electric multiple unit
 Battery electric multiple unit
 Railway electrification system
 Tram

Other uses
"Electric Trains", a 1995 song by Squeeze